Rhonda Ganz is a Canadian poet and illustrator from Victoria, British Columbia, whose debut poetry collection Frequent, Small Loads of Laundry won the 2018 ReLit Award for poetry. It was a finalist for the 2018 City of Victoria Butler Book Prize. The book was also shortlisted for the Dorothy Livesay Poetry Prize in 2018.

References

External links

21st-century Canadian poets
21st-century Canadian women artists
21st-century Canadian women writers
Canadian women poets
Canadian women illustrators
Writers who illustrated their own writing
Writers from Victoria, British Columbia
Living people
Year of birth missing (living people)